Quintin Boat Club (QBC) is a rowing club based at the University of Westminster Boathouse on the River Thames, close to Chiswick Bridge in Chiswick, West London. Formally constituted in 1907, it evolved out of the Regent Street Polytechnic’s rowing club which was started in 1879.  In 1888, the polytechnic's founder, Quintin Hogg, paid to have a boathouse built for it at Chiswick and also paid for a fleet of boats.

The club's first appearance at Henley was in 1920 and they participated at the first Head of the River Race in 1926.

Women were first admitted as members in 1999, and by 2009 formed about a quarter of the membership.

Membership
As a main centre for mature rowing and sculling which consists of multiple Masters categories, the club has had successes at Henley Masters' Regatta, the National Masters Championships ('National Masters') and the World Masters Regatta.

In recent years the club's men squad has had success at various multi lane regattas, Henley Royal Regatta, and consistently finishing top 10 in various 8's head races.

The women's squad also has had a strong presence at local regattas, winning various categories from novice to Elite.

Honours

Henley Royal Regatta

British champions

See also 
Rowing on the River Thames
University of Westminster
Quintin Hogg (merchant)

References

External links 

Tideway Rowing clubs
Sports clubs established in 1907
1907 establishments in England
University of Westminster
Chiswick
Buildings and structures in Chiswick
Rowing clubs of the River Thames